The Baltimore and Potomac Railroad (B&P) operated from Baltimore, Maryland, southwest to Washington, D.C., from 1872 to 1902. Controlled by the Pennsylvania Railroad, it was the second railroad company to connect the nation's capital to the Northeastern States, and competed with the older Baltimore & Ohio Railroad.

Part of the B&P route is now part of Amtrak's Northeast Corridor, the most heavily traveled American intercity passenger line; and of the Penn Line of the Maryland Transit Administration's MARC commuter train service. Its Baltimore and Potomac Tunnel, bored under north Baltimore in 1871, remains in use.

History

Competition with the B&O

The leading advocate for expanding the railroad system into southern Maryland was Walter Bowie, who wrote newspaper articles and columns under the pen name Patuxent Planter and who joined Thomas Fielder Bowie, William Duckett Bowie, and Oden Bowie (later Governor of Maryland), in lobbying the Maryland General Assembly to approve the idea. Their efforts bore fruit on May 6, 1853, when lawmakers chartered the "Baltimore and Potomac Rail Road Company", granting it the authority to construct a railroad from Baltimore via Upper Marlboro in Prince George's County and Port Tobacco in neighboring Charles County to a point on the Potomac River between Liverpool Point and the St. Mary's River in St. Mary's County,  southernmost in the state.

The B&P was organized on December 19, 1858, and began surveying the route on May 3, 1859. Construction started in 1861 but with increasing delays caused by the American Civil War  with its nearby conflicts and supplies shortages, progressed slowly until 1867, when the B&P was purchased by one of the two increasingly dominant Northeastern rail systems of the Pennsylvania Railroad (PRR) and its ally, the Northern Central Railway (NCRY) which ran from Baltimore north into Pennsylvania first to York and then into the state capital at Harrisburg on the Susquehanna River. The PRR at the time had access to Baltimore via its own lines (the NCRY from the north and the Philadelphia, Baltimore & Washington Railroad from the northeast), and used the Baltimore & Ohio Railroad (B&O) and its Washington Branch line to continue southwest to the national capital at  Washington, D.C. The PRR and B&O had trouble getting along, but Maryland refused to grant a charter to end the B&O's monopoly on Baltimore-Washington travel. However, the Baltimore and Potomac charter allowed exactly that, via the clause that allowed branches; all the PRR had to do was take the line within  of Washington. Later the U.S. Congress granted a charter for the section constructed in Washington on February 5, 1867.

Thus the new Baltimore-Washington line opened on July 2, 1872, and the required "main line" to Popes Creek on the Potomac River, immediately relegated to branch status, opened on January 1, 1873. The final section, the Baltimore and Potomac Tunnel under Winchester Street and Wilson Street in Baltimore, opened on June 29, 1873, connecting the line to the PRR's Northern Central Railway (north to Harrisburg) and Baltimore's new Union Station. That year or the next, the Union Railroad also opened, extending the line eastward through another tunnel to the PRR's other Baltimore line, the Philadelphia, Wilmington & Baltimore Railroad (PW&B) northeast to Delaware and Pennsylvania.

Baltimore and Potomac Station in Washington

The first B&P station in Washington was a simple wood-frame structure. A more substantial brick and stone building opened in 1873 at the southwest corner of Sixth Street and B Street NW (later renamed Constitution Avenue). This is the present site of the West Building of the National Gallery of Art, on the National Mall. The station was built over the old Washington City Canal, which complicated the construction of the foundation. Tracks ran south from the station along Sixth Street to a wye junction at Sixth Street SW, Maryland Avenue SW, and Virginia Avenue SW.

On the morning of July 2, 1881, U.S. President Garfield was shot in the waiting room of the B&P station in Washington.  Although the shot was not fatal, he died in September 1881 as a result of infections from the injury.

On November 1, 1902, B&P was consolidated with PW&B to form the Philadelphia, Wilmington & Baltimore Railroad (PB&W), also controlled by PRR.

New Washington Union Station alignment
The Washington Terminal Company and its Union Station opened in 1907, serving the PB&W, the B&O and several other railroads. All PB&W passenger trains from Baltimore were diverted to a new alignment called the Magruder Branch, splitting from the old one at Landover and running west to run parallel with the B&O Washington Branch on the approach to the new station.

Since then, the line has passed under control of Penn Central in 1968, followed by Conrail and Amtrak. Since the breakup of Conrail in 1999, Norfolk Southern has provided freight service over the main line. However, the Pope's Creek Subdivision (originally part of the chartered main line) is operated by CSX Transportation.

Branches
Catonsville
The Catonsville Short Line Railroad opened in 1884 and was immediately leased by the Baltimore & Potomac. This provided a short branch from just south of Baltimore to Catonsville.

Southern Maryland Line
The 48.7-mile (78.4 km) branch to Popes Creek was part of the original chartered main line, but from opening it was operated as a branch of the main line from the junction at Bowie. The main line from Bowie to Washington, a distance of 17.1 miles (27.5 km), was provided for in the charter as a branch.

There was a passenger and freight station at Collington on the Southern Maryland Line. Today, a 5,200-foot railroad siding is all that remains of this stop, although the spur is still in use. It is located at milepost 3.0 on the spur, just south of where the spur crosses under Maryland Route 450 near Maryland Route 197.

References

External links

Corporate Genealogy - Philadelphia, Baltimore & Washington

Companies affiliated with the Philadelphia, Baltimore and Washington Railroad
Companies affiliated with the Pennsylvania Railroad
Standard gauge railways in the United States
Railway companies established in 1853
Railway companies disestablished in 1902
Defunct Maryland railroads
Defunct Washington, D.C., railroads